André Laclôtre, known by the pseudonym André Hellé (16 March 1871, Paris - 29 December 1945, Paris) was a French painter, illustrator, lithographer, and toy designer.

Life and work 
His father was a pharmacist, and he grew up in the Parisian suburb of Boissy-Saint-Léger. In the 1890s, after initially studying the piano, he decided in favor of art and began creating humorous drawings, inspired by a short-lived art movement known as the "Incoherents". He took the name André Hellé around 1896, when his drawings and comic strips were first published professionally.

Much in demand, he found himself very busy until well into the 1930s. His works for an adult audience were published in Le Journal pour tous (1899-1905), La Caricature (1900-1904), Le Rire (1901-1915),  (1902-1930), L'Assiette au Beurre (1903-1910), le Journal amusant (1910-1914), Je sais tout (1909-1912),  (1909-1912),  (1909-1920), and Le Monde Illustré (1932-1937).  He also contributed to the children's magazines, La Joie des Enfants and Le Jeudi de la Jeunesse.

Beginning in 1910, he designed and created wooden toys, including a series called "Noah's Ark". He also devised games and, together with his wife, designed children's play rooms. In 1913, he wrote a ballet scenario for Claude Debussy, based on one of his own children's books, called La Boîte à Joujoux (The Toy Box). Debussy composed a piano score but, due to World War I, production was delayed until 1919, after Debussy's death. 

In the late 1920s, he did decorative work at several summer camps and schools. In 1942, he completed his memoirs, Les Souvenirs d'un Petit Garçon, covering what he describes as an extended childhood. 

In 2015, the municipal library in Boissy-Saint-Léger was named after him.

Sources 
 Selected works and commentary @ Les Amis d'André Hellé website
 "André Hellé, illustre et inconnu" by Jacques Desse @ Ricochet

Further reading 
 Annie Renonciat, Livre mon ami - Lectures enfantines 1914-1954, Paris-Bibliothèques, 1992 
 Béatrice Michielsen, Drôles de jouets - André Hellé ou l'art de l'enfance, Ed Mare-Marin 2012, Catalogue Musée du jouet de Poissy

External links 

 Grosses Bêtes & petites bêtes, Alfred Tolmer & Cie, 1912 (Online @ the Library of Congress)
 Films pour les tout-petits, Librairie Garnier frères, Paris, 1924, 32 pl. (Online @ Gallica)
 Le Tour du monde en 80 pages, éditeur Ferenczi & fils, 1927 (Online @ Gallica)

1871 births
1945 deaths
French cartoonists
French children's book illustrators
Toy designers
Artists from Paris